This is a list of known mass shootings that have occurred in Russia.

2020s

2010s

2000s

1990s

See also 
List of mass shootings in the Soviet Union
Shooting of fellow soldiers
List of massacres in Russia
Mass murder

Notes

References 

Russia crime-related lists
Russia